Odair Hellmann (born 22 January 1977) is a Brazilian football coach and former player who played as a defensive midfielder. He is the current head coach of Santos.

Playing career
Born in Salete, Santa Catarina, Odair was an Internacional youth graduate. He made his first team debut on 8 March 1997, coming on as a substitute in a 1–1 Campeonato Gaúcho away draw against Grêmio Santanense. After winning the 1998 Copa São Paulo de Futebol Júnior with the under-20 side, he was definitely promoted to the main squad, and featured more during that year.

Odair was loaned to Fluminense in the Série C for the 1999 season. Upon returning, he was released by the club, and played for Veranópolis in th 2001 Campeonato Gaúcho. He was also a part of the América de Natal squad in the 2001 Série B, but never featured in a single minute.

In 2002, Odair joined Mamoré as the club was playing in the Copa Sul-Minas, and made his debut against former club Internacional. He started the 2003 campaign at Brasil de Pelotas before moving abroad with Swedish Allsvenskan side Enköpings SK in July; he suffered an injury while training, staying two months sidelined at the latter and subsequently only playing rarely.

Odair returned to Brazil in 2004, after agreeing to a contract with America-RJ. He moved to Remo in the following year, and helped the side to win the third division. After losing his starting spot in 2006, he was also an interim coach for a brief period after Artur Neto was sacked, managing the club in one match before returning to his player status.

After a brief period at CRB (where he struggled with injuries), Odair represented Hong Kong First Division League club Eastern SC in the 2007–08 season. He returned to Brasil de Pelotas in December 2008, and was among the squad which suffered an accident after the team bus plunged 130 ft into a ravine in the following January. He suffered minor back injuries from the accident, which he fully recovered in October of that year, but still opted to retire.

Managerial career

Internacional
After retiring, Hellmann started working as an assistant manager at his former club Internacional, initially assigned to the under-17 squad. In 2013, he became the permanent assistant manager of the first team. In 2015, he was also in charge of the first team for two matches, replacing fired Diego Aguirre.

Ahead of the 2016 Summer Olympics, Hellmann worked as Rogério Micale's assistant in the Brazil under-23 squad, helping the side to achieve the gold medal for the first time in history. Upon returning to Inter, he was appointed interim manager on 11 November 2017, after the dismissal of Guto Ferreira; he also previously worked in that capacity for one match in May, after the dismissal of Antônio Carlos Zago.

On 25 November 2017, Hellmann was announced as manager of the club for the 2018 season. After qualifying for the 2019 Copa Libertadores, he remained as manager for the 2019 season, as they went on to reach the finals in the 2019 Copa do Brasil, but lost it to Athletico Paranaense.

On 10 October 2019, after being knocked out by Flamengo in the Libertadores quarterfinals and a streak of four games without a league win, Hellmann was dismissed by Internacional.

Fluminense
On 11 December 2019, Hellmann was appointed manager of another of his former clubs, Fluminense. He reached the 2020 Campeonato Carioca finals, but lost to Flamengo.

On 7 December 2020, Hellmann left Fluminense after receiving an offer from Emirati club Al-Wasl, and was replaced by assistant Marcão.

Al-Wasl
Hellmann was confirmed as manager of Al-Wasl on 8 December 2020. He rescinded his contract with the club on 27 June 2022, after finishing in the sixth position in the 2021–22 UAE Pro League.

Santos
On 16 November 2022, Hellmann was named manager of Santos back in his home country, and signed a one-year contract.

Career statistics

Managerial statistics

Honours

Player
Internacional
 Campeonato Gaúcho: 1997

Fluminense
 Campeonato Brasileiro Série C: 1999

Remo
 Campeonato Brasileiro Série C: 2005

Assistant manager
Brazil Olympic
Summer Olympics Gold medal: 2016

References

External links

1951 births
Living people
Sportspeople from Santa Catarina (state)
Brazilian footballers
Association football midfielders
Campeonato Brasileiro Série A players
Campeonato Brasileiro Série B players
Campeonato Brasileiro Série C players
Sport Club Internacional players
Fluminense FC players
Veranópolis Esporte Clube Recreativo e Cultural players
América Futebol Clube (RN) players
Esporte Clube Mamoré players
Grêmio Esportivo Brasil players
America Football Club (RJ) players
Clube do Remo players
Clube de Regatas Brasil players
Allsvenskan players
Enköpings SK players
Hong Kong Premier League players
Eastern Sports Club footballers
Brazil under-20 international footballers
Brazilian expatriate footballers
Brazilian expatriate sportspeople in Sweden
Brazilian expatriate sportspeople in Hong Kong
Expatriate footballers in Sweden
Expatriate footballers in Hong Kong
Brazilian football managers
Campeonato Brasileiro Série A managers
Campeonato Brasileiro Série B managers
UAE Pro League managers
Clube do Remo managers
Sport Club Internacional managers
Fluminense FC managers
Al-Wasl F.C. managers
Santos FC managers
Brazilian expatriate football managers
Brazilian expatriate sportspeople in the United Arab Emirates
Expatriate football managers in the United Arab Emirates